Herbert Anthony Bull (24 May 1930 – 22 November 2019) was an Australian rules footballer who played with Melbourne in the Victorian Football League (VFL).

After retiring as a player, Bull became a junior coach and recruiting officer for Melbourne.

Notes

External links 

Profile at Demonwiki

1930 births
2019 deaths
Australian rules footballers from Victoria (Australia)
Melbourne Football Club players
South Bendigo Football Club players